Winston Choo Wee Leong (born 18 July 1941) is a Singaporean diplomat and former lieutenant-general who served as the first and longest-serving Chief of Defence Force between 1974 and 1992.

Early life and education
Born in Singapore, Choo grew up in Makepeace Road in the Newton area. He was given the name "Winston" by his grandfather, who named him after Winston Churchill. 

He attended Monk's Hill School between 1947 and 1952, and the Anglo-Chinese School between 1953 and 1957. During his time at the Anglo-Chinese School, Choo was the captain of his school's football team, played hockey, and won the Queen's Badge for his activities in The Boys' Brigade.

Military career

Choo enlisted in the Singapore Military Forces (renamed "Singapore Armed Forces (SAF)" in 1961) in December 1959 and was commissioned as a second lieutenant in December 1961 after completing his officer cadet training in Sungai Besi, Malaysia. Following that, he served as a platoon commander in the 1st Battalion Singapore Infantry Regiment (1 SIR) and was involved in two major operations. The first was when he was deployed to Sebatik Island, Borneo between 1963 and 1964 during the Konfrontasi. The second was when he led his men in patrolling the streets during the 1964 race riots in Singapore.

After Singapore became independent on 9 August 1965, Choo, then the battalion signals officer, was appointed as a military aide-de-camp to Yusof bin Ishak, Singapore's first President. He was recalled to the SAF in 1966 and served as the first Commanding Officer (CO) of the 1st Signal Battalion from 1967–1968. Between 1968 and 1969, Choo attended the Long Telecommunications Course at the School of Signals in the United Kingdom, returning to Singapore to serve as the Second-in-Command (2IC) of the 1st Signal Battalion. In 1970, he was appointed as the Chief of Communications and Electronics (now known as Chief Signals Officer).

In 1971, Choo served briefly as the CO of the 4th Battalion Singapore Infantry Regiment (4 SIR) before attending the Command and Staff College at Fort Canning. In the following year, he attended the US Army Command and General Staff course at Fort Leavenworth in Kansas, United States, and graduated with distinctions in all his subjects.

Upon his return to Singapore in September 1972, Choo assumed command of 1 SIR. In the same year, he was named an honorary aide-de-camp to Benjamin Sheares, Singapore's second President, and took up command of the 2nd Singapore Infantry Brigade (2 SIB). He was also promoted to the rank of colonel. He was later posted to the Defence Ministry (MINDEF)'s headquarters, where he was appointed the Head of Training and Head of Organisation and Plans in 1973. In 1974, he succeeded Kirpa Ram Vij as the Director of General Staff (renamed to "Chief of General Staff" in 1976). Choo was promoted to brigadier (now replaced by Brigadier-General) in 1976 and to Major-General two years later.

Between 1978 and 1981, Choo attended a preparatory course in military history at the Department of History of the National University of Singapore. In 1981, he went to the United States to study for a master's degree in military history at Duke University and returned to Singapore in 1982 to resume his post as the Chief of General Staff.

Choo was promoted to lieutenant-general in 1988 and became the first Chief of Defence Force (CDF) in May 1990 after "Chief of General Staff" was renamed. He retired from the SAF on 30 June 1992, after which he went to Harvard Business School and attended the six-week Advanced Management Program.

Diplomatic career
After retiring from military service, Choo joined the Ministry of Foreign Affairs (MFA) and served as Singapore's High Commissioner to Australia and Singapore's High Commissioner to Fiji concurrently between 1994 and 1997. 

He had also served as Singapore's Non-Resident High Commissioner to Papua New Guinea between 2000 and 2006 and Singapore's High Commissioner to South Africa between 2001 and 2005. 

Choo was appointed Singapore's Non-Resident Ambassador to Israel in 2005, and has since been succeeded by Lim Chuan Poh who was appointed in 2021.

Other work
Apart from his military and diplomatic careers, Choo took on non-executive roles in various governmental and non-governmental organisations, including: 

 Deputy Chairman, Central Provident Fund (1992–1994)
 Chairman, Chartered Industries (1992–1994)
 Board Member, Singapore Technologies (1984–1992)
 Board Member, Keppel-Tat Lee Bank (1992–2001)
 Chairman, Metro Holdings (2007–present)
 Chairman, Singapore Red Cross Society (1996–2008)
 Member, Singapore Sports Council (late 1970s)
 Member, National Youth Achievement Award Council
 Honorary President, Boys' Brigade (2011–present)

Choo has also contributed to several publications, including his recollections of Goh Keng Swee and his time in the Ministry of Foreign Affairs (MFA). He also supported the Dads for Life movement in Singapore by contributing to the book Letters from Grandpa and Grandma published in 2008.

Personal life
Choo married to Katherine Seow on 3 December 1966 and had two children together, Warren Choo and Karina Choo.

Awards
Throughout his career, Choo won many accolades, some of the medals were displayed at a National Library Board exhibition in 2006. The following is a partial list of his medals:

National honours
 
  Darjah Utama Bakti Cemerlang (Distinguished Service Order), in 2015.
  Bintang Bakti Masyarakat (Public Service Star), in 2009, for his work with the Ministry of Foreign Affairs.
  Pingat Bakti Masyarakat (Public Service Medal), in 2005, for his work with the Singapore Red Cross Society in tsunami relief operations.
  Pingat Pentadbiran Awam, Emas (Public Administration Medal, Gold), in 1978.
  Meritorious Service Medal (Military), in 1990, for exceptional distinguished service in military command or staff work.
  Public Administration Medal (Gold) (Military), in 1981.
  Pingat Bakti Setia (Long Service Medal)
  Singapore Armed Forces Long Service and Good Conduct (20 Years) Medal
  Singapore Armed Forces Long Service and Good Conduct (10 Years) Medal with 15 year clasp
  Singapore Armed Forces Good Service Medal
  Pingat Pertahanan (The Defence Medal)

Foreign honours
 
  Pingat Perkhidmatan Anggota Beruniform Malaysia (The Uniformed Service Malaysia Medal)
  Darjah Panglima Gagah Angkatan Tentera (Honorary Malaysian Armed Forces Order for Valour (First Degree)), in 1987.

 
  US Legion Of Merit (Commander), in 1978.

 
  Bintang Yudha Dharma Utama (1st Class), in 1986.

 
  The Most Exalted Order of Paduka Keberanian Laila Terbilang (1st Class)

 
  Order of the Crown of Thailand (1st Class), Thailand

 
  Order of National Security Merit, Tongil Medal (통일장), South Korea

References

External links

 Winston Choo article on Infopedia, National Library Board Singapore
 MINDEF Singapore : The SAF's Pioneer Infantry Battalion Turns 50

Chiefs of Defence Force (Singapore)
Singaporean diplomats
Singaporean people of Hokkien descent
Singaporean people of Chinese descent
Ambassadors of Singapore to Israel
High Commissioners of Singapore to Australia
High Commissioners of Singapore to Fiji
High Commissioners of Singapore to Papua New Guinea
Anglo-Chinese School alumni
Duke University alumni
1941 births
Living people
Recipients of the Pingat Pentadbiran Awam
Recipients of the Long Service Medal (Military) (Singapore)
Recipients of the Pingat Bakti Setia